The East Two River is a  tributary of the Saint Louis River in northern Minnesota, United States. It rises at the outlet of Silver Lake in the city of Virginia and flows southwest, joining the Saint Louis River in McDavitt Township, just upstream of the outlet of the West Two River.

See also
List of rivers of Minnesota

References

Minnesota Watersheds
USGS Hydrologic Unit Map - State of Minnesota (1974)

Rivers of Minnesota
Rivers of St. Louis County, Minnesota